is a city tram station on the Takaoka Kidō Line located in Takaoka, Toyama Prefecture, Japan.

Surrounding area
JUSCO Takaoka

Railway stations in Toyama Prefecture